Trainguard MT is a communication-based train control (CBTC) developed by Siemens Transportation Systems (ex Matra Transport international, and now integrated into Siemens Mobility) which allows fully automated circulation of rapid transit trains, and thanks to moving block system, less time between trains.

Rapid transit lines using Trainguard MT 
 Algiers Metro
 Barcelona Metro Line 9
 Budapest Metro Line M2 and Line M4
 Copenhagen S-train
 Crossrail 
 Greater Jakarta LRT (Open in 2022)
 Guangfo Metro
 Guangzhou Metro Line 4 and Line 5
 MTR East Rail Line
 New York City Subway  (see also Signaling of the New York City Subway#Automation)
 Paris Métro Line 14, under the name of "SAET"
 São Paulo Metro Line 4
 Seoul Metropolitan Subway Seohae Line (Metro Section only)
 Sofia Metro Line 3

References 

Rapid transit
Train protection systems